When Love Finds You is the sixth studio album from American country music artist Vince Gill. It was released in 1994 on MCA Nashville. It features the singles "Whenever You Come Around," "What the Cowgirls Do," "When Love Finds You," "Which Bridge to Cross (Which Bridge to Burn)," "You Better Think Twice" and "Go Rest High on That Mountain."

Track listing

1 Produced by Tony Brown & Don Was – From Rhythm, Country and Blues

2 From Common Thread: The Songs of the Eagles

Personnel 
As listed in the liner notes.

 Vince Gill – lead vocals, backing vocals (1-10, 13), electric guitar (1, 2, 4, 5, 6, 8, 11), electric guitar solo (1, 2, 4-8, 11), acoustic guitar (8, 10), mandolin (8)
 John Barlow Jarvis – synthesizer pads (1), acoustic piano (2, 6, 8), Wurlitzer electric piano (3), keyboards (4, 5), Hammond B3 organ (7, 10, 11), electric piano (8)
 Pete Wasner – keyboards (1, 2, 3, 6, 7, 8, 10, 11), synthesizers (3, 9), acoustic piano (4, 11), Wurlitzer electric piano  (10, 13)
 Barry Beckett – acoustic piano additions (2)
 Steve Nathan – Hammond B3 organ (2, 8, 13), synthesizers (2, 8, 13)
 Michael Omartian – acoustic piano (5), accordion (5), synthesizers (5)
 Matt Rollings – acoustic piano (9)
 Nat Adderley Jr. – acoustic piano (12)
 Benmont Tench – Hammond C3 organ (12)
 Randy Scruggs – acoustic guitar (1-11)
 Steuart Smith – electric guitar (1-8, 10, 11), tic-tac electric guitar (3)
 Billy Joe Walker Jr. – electric guitar (9)
 Mark Goldenberg – acoustic guitar (12)
 Reggie Young – electric guitar (12)
 George Marinelli – electric guitar (13)
 John Hughey – steel guitar (3, 9, 11)
 Robby Turner – pedal steel guitar (12)
 Willie Weeks – bass guitar (1, 4-7, 9)
 Michael Rhodes – bass guitar (2, 3, 8, 10, 11)
 Freddie Washington – bass guitar (12)
 David Hungate – bass guitar (13)
 Carlos Vega – drums (1-8, 10, 11)
 Milton Sledge – drums (9, 13)
 Kenny Aronoff – drums (12)
 Tom Roady – percussion (1-8, 10, 11)
 Lenny Castro – percussion (12)
 Stuart Duncan – fiddle (3, 4, 9, 11)
 Jim Horn – soprano saxophone (13)
 David Campbell – string arrangements (12)
 Trisha Yearwood – backing vocals (1)
 Jonell Mosser – backing vocals (2)
 Billy Thomas – backing vocals (2, 4, 5, 7-10)
 Alison Krauss – backing vocals (3)
 Jeff White – backing vocals (5, 7, 8, 9)
 Michael McDonald – backing vocals (6)
 Dawn Sears – backing vocals (9)
 Amy Grant – backing vocals (10)
 Patty Loveless – backing vocals (11)
 Ricky Skaggs – backing vocals (11)
 Gladys Knight – lead and backing vocals (12)
 Timothy B. Schmit – backing vocals (13)

Production 
Production credits (Tracks 1-11)
 Tony Brown – producer
 Chuck Ainlay – recording, overdub recording
 Marty Williams – overdub recording
 Derek Bason – second engineer
 Tony Green – second engineer
 Graham Lewis – second engineer
 John Thomas II – second engineer
 Craig White – second engineer
 John Guess – mixing, mastering
 Glenn Meadows – mastering
 Recorded and Overdubbed at Sound Stage Studios (Nashville, TN).
 Mixed and Mastered at Masterfonics (Nashville, TN).

Production credits (Tracks 12 & 13)
 Don Was – producer (12)
 Tony Brown – producer (12, 13)
 Rik Pekkonen – recording (12)
 Steve Marcantonio – engineer (13)
 Dan Bosworth – recording assistant (12)
 Russ Martin – assistant engineer (13)
 Bob Clearmountain – mixing (12)
 John Guess – mixing (13)
 Doug Sax – mastering (12)
 Recorded at Ocean Way Studios and A&M Studios (Hollywood, CA); Mix This! (Pacific Palisades, CA); Sound Stage Studios and Masterfonics (Nashville, TN).
 Mixed at Woodland Studios and Masterfonics (Nashville, TN).
 Track 12 mastered at The Mastering Lab (Hollywood, CA).

Additional credits
 Jessie Noble – project coordinator 
 Virginia Team – art direction 
 Jerry Joyner – design 
 Naomi Kaltman – photography 
 Cheryl Riddle – hair
 Mary Beth Felts – make-up 
 Trish Townsend – stylist 
 The Fitzgerald Hartley Co. – management

Charts

Weekly charts

Year-end charts

References

1994 albums
Vince Gill albums
MCA Records albums
Albums produced by Tony Brown (record producer)